Conjugated estrogens/methyltestosterone (CEEs/MT), sold under the brand name Premarin with Methyltestosterone, is a combination of conjugated estrogens (CEEs), an estrogen, and methyltestosterone (MT), an androgen and anabolic steroid (AAR), which is used in menopausal hormone therapy for women. It contains 0.625 to 1.25 mg CEEs and 5 to 10 mg MT. The medication was marketed by Wyeth-Ayerst. CEEs/MT was previously marketed in the United States and Canada. It remains available only in Paraguay, under the brand names Delitan and Delitan Forte.

See also 
 Esterified estrogens/methyltestosterone
 List of combined sex-hormonal preparations

References 

Abandoned drugs
Combined estrogen–androgen formulations